The districts of Turkmenistan (sing. etrap) are territorial entities below the provinces of Turkmenistan (sing. welaýat). They may be counties, cities, or boroughs of cities.  The heads of the districts (translated as "governor" for districts of a welaýat and "mayor" for cities or boroughs of a city) are appointed by the President of Turkmenistan (Constitution of Turkmenistan, Articles 80-81).

Regarding cities "with district status", by Turkmen law, "...such cities must have population over 30,000 and be the administrative center of a province (welaýat); headed by a presidentially appointed häkim."  Though this officially limits the possible number of such cities to five (the number of provinces), in reality other cities are periodically accorded the status of a district.  As of 5 January 2018, 11 cities in Turkmenistan enjoyed the status of districts, including four of the five provincial (welaýat) centers.  One city, the capital city of Ashgabat, enjoys the status of a province.

Two cities in Turkmenistan feature subordinate districts headed by mayors.  Such districts are best rendered into English as "boroughs" to distinguish them from municipal districts without their own governments, which are also called etraplar in Turkmen (but are called микрорайоны in Russian). Ashgabat has four boroughs and as of November 2022 Turkmenbashy has one.

List of districts by first-level entity

Aşgabat City
See also Map of the Boroughs of Ashgabat

As of January 5, 2018, Ashgabat includes four boroughs (uly etraplar):

 Bagtyýarlyk etraby (formerly President Niyazov, Lenin District, expanded to include former Ruhabat District plus new territory)
 Berkararlyk etraby (formerly Azatlyk, Sovetskiy District)
 Büzmeýin etraby (formerly Abadan District, expanded to include former Arçabil and Çandybil Districts)
 Köpetdag etraby (formerly Proletarskiy District)

This number is a reduction from the previous number of boroughs.

Ahal Province
 Ak bugdaý (formerly Gäwers)
Babadaýhan
Bäherden (formerly Baharly)
Gökdepe
Kaka
Sarahs
Tejen

Balkan Province
 County Districts:
 Bereket (previously Gazanjyk)
 Esenguly
 Etrek (previously Gyzyletrek)
 Gyzylarbat (previously Gyzylarvat, Serdar)
 Magtymguly (previously Garry Gala)
 Türkmenbaşy

 City Boroughs of Türkmenbaşy City:
 Awaza etraby

Daşoguz Province 
Akdepe
Boldumsaz
Görogly (formerly Tagta)
Köneurgenç
Ruhubelent
Shabat (formerly Dashoguz/Dashowuz, Nyýazow)
Saparmyrat Türkmenbaşy

Lebap Province 
 Çärjew (formerly Türkmenabat/Serdarabat)
 Dänew (formerly Galkynyş)
 Darganata (formerly Birata)
 Halaç
 Hojambaz
 Kerki (formerly Atamyrat)
 Köýtendag (formerly Çarşaňňy)
 Saýat

Mary Province
 Baýramaly
 Garagum
 Mary
 Murgap
 Sakarçäge
 Tagtabazar
 Türkmengala
 Wekilbazar
 Ýolöten

Cities with "district status"

Under Turkmen law, some cities are granted "district status", meaning they are headed by a presidentially appointed mayor and control their own budgets.  Cities without this status (cities "in a district") are headed by a council chaired by an arçyn rather than a mayor.  Cities in Turkmenistan with district status are:

Ahal Province
Arkadag şäheri
Balkan Province
Balkanabat şäheri
Türkmenbaşy şäheri
Daşoguz Province
Daşoguz şäheri
Lebap Province
Türkmenabat şäheri
Mary Province
Baýramaly şäheri
Mary şäheri

Abolished districts
These districts no longer exist.

Altyn Asyr District
Archabil District
Beýik Türkmenbaşy District
Çandybil District
Derweze District
Döwletli District
Farap District
Garabekewül District
Gubadag District
Gurbansoltan Eje District
Kenar District (Türkmenbaşy City)
Magdanly District
Oguzhan District
Ruhabat District
Sakar District
Serhetabat District

See also
 Regions of Turkmenistan
 OpenStreetMap Wiki: Districts in Turkmenistan

References

External links
Statoids

 
Subdivisions of Turkmenistan
Turkmenistan, Districts
Turkmenistan 2
Districts, Turkmenistan
Turkmenistan geography-related lists